Zita Kácser (born 2 October 1988) is a retired Hungarian Olympic distance runner. She also twice represented Hungary at the European Athletics Championships in the 3000 metres steeplechase. A twelve-time Hungarian champion overall, Kácser Zita won national titles twice over 3000m indoors as well as winning multiple titles outdoors. These came in the steeplechase, 5000m, 10,000m and the half-marathon.

Career
Kácser recovered from injury to run a national record time in 2019 for the 3000m steeplechase at the Hidegkuti Nándor Stadion in Budapest. At the same time she also met the qualifying standard for the then delayed 2020 Tokyo Olympics. The time of 09:26:59 put her 18th on the IAAF's world rankings. She competed at the Athletics at the 2020 Summer Olympics – Women's 3000 metres steeplechase. In 2021 she won her tenth national championship outdoor title when she triumphed in the half-marathon in Székesfehérvár. It was her sixth half marathon national title following previous wins in 2015, 2016, 2017, 2018 and 2019. She announced her retirement from international running would come at the end of 2021. After being hired by sports team Diósgyőri VTK as a physiotherapist in 2022 she still competed, and won, the 3000m steeplechase in May 2022 at the Hungarian team championships regional round, helping DVTK qualify for the finals. The victory came despite a fall which caused a wound on her leg to need stitches after the  race had finished.

International competitions

References

External links
Zita Kácser at the-sports.org

1988 births
Living people
Sportspeople from Dunaújváros
Hungarian female steeplechase runners
Hungarian female long-distance runners
Athletes (track and field) at the 2020 Summer Olympics
Olympic athletes of Hungary
21st-century Hungarian women